Donald J. Matthews, a.k.a. "The Don", (June 22, 1939 – June 14, 2017) was a head coach of several professional football teams, mostly in the Canadian Football League (CFL). He won 231 games in the CFL, the second highest win total by a head coach in the league's history while leading four teams to Grey Cup victories. He was inducted into the Canadian Football Hall of Fame in September 2011.

Early life and college
Matthews was born in Amesbury, Massachusetts, the son of Canadian-born parents, Ida (Babin), from Tracadie, New Brunswick, and Fred Matthews, a steel mill worker from Prince Edward Island. From a large family of limited means and education, he quit high school in Amesbury after his senior season of football in 1956 and served three years in the U.S. Marine Corps.

Matthews returned home and earned his high school diploma and then on the advice of a teacher, ventured west in 1960 as a 21-year-old freshman to Moscow, Idaho. He walked-on at Idaho as a linebacker on the freshman team; he was awarded a scholarship by varsity head coach Skip Stahley after his first semester. He earned three letters and was a team captain in his senior season of 1963, when the Vandals, in their second year under Dee Andros, achieved their first winning season in a quarter century. Matthews graduated from the University of Idaho with a degree in education in 1964.

Early career
Matthews was a graduate assistant for the Vandals in Moscow for the 1964 season under Andros and freshman coach Bud Riley. Matthews then coached high school football in Nevada at Ely for four years and won a state title. He relocated to eastern Washington at Spokane in 1969 as head coach at Ferris, where he led the Saxons to the city title in his second and final year.

Matthews became a collegiate assistant coach back at his alma mater in 1971 as offensive line coach (later as offensive coordinator), under second-year head coach Don Robbins. At the time it was the best record in school history, and three seniors were selected in the 1972 NFL Draft. Two years later, Robbins was fired following the 1973 season and Matthews moved to the Portland area. He took over a winless program at Sunset High School in Beaverton and won consecutive state championships in 1975 and 1976, going undefeated in his third and final year. He left Sunset after the 1976 season to become a CFL  assistant coach in Edmonton, Alberta.

Pro coaching career 
Matthews was formerly head coach of the CFL's BC Lions, Saskatchewan Roughriders, Baltimore Stallions, Toronto Argonauts, Edmonton Eskimos, and Montreal Alouettes. He was also head coach of the Orlando Thunder of the World League of American Football in 1991.

After coaching the Eskimos for two seasons, Matthews resigned as head coach just prior to the team's first preseason game on June 18, 2001.

In October 2006, Matthews stepped down as head coach of the Alouettes expressing undisclosed health issues that were "affecting his ability to perform".

In May 2008, Matthews was announced as an advisor to the Jeff Hunt-led group's conditional Ottawa franchise.

Don Matthews returned to Toronto on September 9, 2008, as the interim coach for the Argonauts, after they started the season with a 4–6 record.  In that press conference, Matthews revealed that the major health reason that caused him to step down as head coach of the Alouettes was an anxiety disorder.  He also went further to say that he had been prescribed to some medication and the anxiety attacks are now under control. On October 31, 2008, he resigned from the Argonauts a day after the conclusion of the Argonauts 2008 regular season, which saw the Argos fail to win a game in the eight games under his leadership and finishing out of the playoffs for the first time since the 2001 CFL season.

Matthews was selected for induction in the Builder category into the Canadian Football Hall of Fame on February 10, 2011.

On November 5, 2012, Matthews announced he was battling cancer and therefore would not be able to participate in any of the festivities for the 100th Grey Cup in Toronto.

The Montreal Alouettes announced on July 30, 2014, that Matthews had joined the team in a coaching consultant role for the second consecutive year.

Coaching records 
Don Matthews holds several head coaching records:
Most Grey Cup appearances (9 – tied)
Most Grey Cup wins (5 – tied)
He also has an additional five Grey Cup titles as defensive co-ordinator of the Edmonton Eskimos.

CFL head coaching record
Source: justsportsstats.com

Personal
Matthews' mother, Ida, was a francophone from Tracadie, New Brunswick, while his father, Fred, was from Prince Edward Island. Had current Canadian nationality laws been in effect in 1939, Matthews would have become a Canadian citizen under the principle of jus sanguines, but separate Canadian citizenship was not enacted until 1947 and was not extended retroactively to anyone born outside the country prior to 1947. In 2004, Matthews became a naturalized Canadian citizen.

Matthews has three sons and six grandchildren. He lived in Beaverton, Oregon, with his wife Stephanie and stepson Blaze.

After a long 5-year battle with cancer, Matthews died on June 14, 2017.

See also
 List of Canadian Football League head coaches by wins
 List of professional gridiron football coaches with 200 wins

References

External links
 Toronto Argonauts profile
 Canadian Football Hall of Fame profile

1939 births
2017 deaths
American football linebackers
Baltimore Stallions coaches
BC Lions coaches
Edmonton Elks coaches
Idaho Vandals football coaches
Idaho Vandals football players
Montreal Alouettes coaches
Orlando Thunder coaches
Saskatchewan Roughriders coaches
Toronto Argonauts coaches
Toronto Argonauts general managers
High school football coaches in Oregon
High school football coaches in Nevada
High school football coaches in Washington (state)
Canadian Football Hall of Fame inductees
People from Amesbury, Massachusetts
Players of American football from Massachusetts
Sportspeople from Essex County, Massachusetts
American emigrants to Canada
American people of Canadian descent
Naturalized citizens of Canada
Deaths from cancer in Oregon